Großer Stadtsee is a lake in the Mecklenburgische Seenplatte district in Mecklenburg-Vorpommern, Germany. At an elevation of 43.9 m, its surface area is 0.88 km².

Lakes of Mecklenburg-Western Pomerania